Aerodrom may refer to:

Places 
 Aerodrom Municipality, Skopje, a municipality of the city of Skopje, North Macedonia
 Aerodrom, Skopje, a neighbourhood of Skopje, and seat of the municipality
 Aerodrom, Kragujevac, a former city municipality of the city of Kragujevac, Serbia

Other uses 
 Aerodrom (band), a Yugoslav, now Croatian rock band from Zagreb

See also
 Aerodrome (disambiguation)